Djene Barry (born February 6, 1982, in Conakry) is a Guinean swimmer, specialized in sprint freestyle events. She competed at the 2008 Summer Olympics in Beijing, where she finished eighty-ninth overall for the heats in the women's 50 m freestyle event, with a time of 39.80 seconds.

References

External links
NBC Olympics Profile

Guinean female swimmers
Living people
Sportspeople from Conakry
Olympic swimmers of Guinea
Swimmers at the 2008 Summer Olympics
Guinean female freestyle swimmers
1982 births